The 2012 Reinert Open was a professional tennis tournament played on outdoor clay courts. It was the 5th edition of the tournament and was part of the 2012 ITF Women's Circuit. It took place in Versmold, Germany between 2 and 8 July 2012.

WTA entrants

Seeds

 Rankings are as of June 25, 2012.

Other entrants
The following players received wildcards into the singles main draw:
  Anna-Lena Friedsam
  Julia Wachaczyk
  Carina Witthöft

The following players received entry from the qualifying draw:
  Margarita Gasparyan
  Anaïs Laurendon
  Stephanie Vogt
  Anna Zaja

The following players received entry from a Lucky loser spot:
  María Irigoyen

Champions

Singles

 Annika Beck def.  Anastasija Sevastova, 6–3, 6–1

Doubles

 Mailen Auroux /  María Irigoyen def.  Elena Bogdan /  Réka-Luca Jani, 6–1, 6–4

External links
Official website
ITF website

Reinert Open
Reinert
2012 in German tennis
2012 in German women's sport